Salvador del Mundo (Spanish for "savior of the world") may refer to:

 Salvador del Mundo (chemist) (1902–1945), Filipino chemist
 Salvador del Mundo (ship), formerly of the Spanish Navy
 Salvador del Mundo, Asunción, neighborhood in Asunción, Paraguay
 San Salvador del Mundo Church, church in the Philippines
 Monumento al Divino Salvador del Mundo, monument in San Salvador, El Salvador

See also 
 San Salvador (disambiguation)